Ida Red is a 2021 American crime drama film written and directed by John Swab and starring Josh Hartnett, Frank Grillo and Melissa Leo.

It had its world premiere at the Locarno Film Festival on August 11, 2021, and it was released in the United States on November 5, 2021 by Saban Films.

Plot
Ida "Red" Walker (Melissa Leo), the biological mother of a criminal family, sits rotting in jail. She is a widow as a result of the bust that nabbed her. Now that she's got cancer, she wants to die in freedom. So she plots both a parole and, true to form, a heist.

Her son is a successful career criminal, ethical Wyatt (Josh Hartnett) and so is brother-in-law, psycho Dallas (Frank Grillo). There is also sister Jeanie (Deborah Ann Woll), estranged from Ida because she married kind and dim cop Bodie Collier (George Carroll). Their rebellious teen kid Darla (Sofia Hublitz) is drawn to uncle Wyatt and is romantically involved with local dirtbag Petey (Nicholas Cirillo).

Wyatt's having a hard time after a truck heist goes wrong, and cranky FBI Special Agent Lawrence Twilley (William Forsythe), who is partnering with Collier, is on the trail. Dallas, who appoints himself cleaner, nastily shoots people responsible for the screw-up, or their kin.

Cast
Josh Hartnett as Wyatt Walker
Frank Grillo as Dallas Walker
Melissa Leo as Ida "Red" Walker
Sofia Hublitz as Darla Walker
Deborah Ann Woll as Jeanie Walker
Mark Boone Junior as Benson Drummond
George Carroll as Bodie Collier
William Forsythe as Lawrence Twilley
Beau Knapp as Jay
Nicholas Cirillo as Petey
 John Swab as Jerry

Production
Principal photography occurred in August and September 2020 in Tulsa, Oklahoma.

Release
It had its world premiere at the Locarno Film Festival in August 11, 2021. It will have its North American premiere at the Fantasia International Film Festival, also in August 2021. Prior to, Saban Films acquired U.S. and U.K. distribution rights to the film. It is scheduled to be released on November 5, 2021.

Reception
Review aggregator Rotten Tomatoes gives the film a 33% approval rating based on 18 reviews, with an average rating of 5.10/10.

Angie Han, writing for The Hollywood Reporter, criticized the first scene as "set in tedium and confusion" but highlighted two memorable elements categorizing them in "what-does-this-remind-me-of feeling" part of the film and Grillo's performance. However, Han said that Ida Red does not make much impression and concluded, writing that "[the film] turns out to be just the latest faint echo of stories we’ve heard too many times already."

References

External links
 
 

2021 crime drama films
2020s English-language films
2020s heist films
American crime drama films
American heist films
Films scored by David Sardy
Films shot in Oklahoma
Saban Films films
2020s American films